ROKS Daegu (FFG-818) is the lead ship of the Daegu-class frigate in the Republic of Korea Navy. She is named after the city, Daegu.

Development 

Modifications to the Incheon-class include a TB-250K towed array sonar system and a 16-cell Korean Vertical Launching System (K-VLS) that is able to deploy the K-SAAM, Hong Sang Eo anti-submarine missile, and Haeryong tactical land attack cruise missiles.

The hull design is generally based on the one of the Incheon-class. However, as a part of weapon system modifications, the superstructure has been significantly changed. The hangar and the helicopter deck have been enlarged to support the operation of a 10-ton helicopter.

Construction and career 
ROKS Daegu was launched on 2 June 2016 by Daewoo Shipbuilding and commissioned on 6 March 2018.

References

2016 ships
Ships built by Daewoo Shipbuilding & Marine Engineering
Daegu-class frigates